Melchi may refer to:

Melchi (biblical figure), a minor biblical character
Melchi, a character from the Tezuka manga Jetter Mars
Melchi, a character from the mecha anime Strain: Strategic Armored Infantry
Melchi Zedek, an alias of Nuwabian leader Dwight York
Villa Melchi, a villa in Borgo Forte, Montemurlo, Italy